Kohneh Sar is a village in Kasma Rural District, in the Central District of Sowme'eh Sara County, Gilan Province, Iran. At the 2006 census, its population was 541 consisting 142 families.

References 

Populated places in Sowme'eh Sara County